Anah Hajji (also Romanized as Ānāh Ḩājjī; also known as Ānā Ḩājjī) is a village in Jafarbay-ye Jonubi Rural District, in the Central District of Torkaman County, Golestan Province, Iran. At the 2006 census, its population was 183, in 36 families.

References 

Populated places in Torkaman County